Steven Brill may refer to:

 Steven Brill (filmmaker) (born 1962), American actor, director and screenwriter
 Steven Brill (journalist) (born 1950), American lawyer, journalist and entrepreneur 
 "Wildman" Steve Brill, American naturalist and author